Mohammadreza Ghodratipour is an Iranian football goalkeeper who plays for Saba Qom in the Iran Pro League.

Club career

Early years
He started his career with Iran Sport Isfahan when he was 8. After 4 years he joined Sepahan Academy. He is part of Sepahan Academy until 2012.

Foolad Yazd
He joined Foolad Yazd in summer 2012. He is also part of Foolad Yazd U21 however he failed to play a single match for Foolad Yazd first team.

Rah Ahan
After a season in Yazd, he joined Rah Ahan U21 and helped them to reach 4th place in the 2013–14 Tehran U21 League. After a successful season with Rah Ahan U21 he was promoted to first team by club coach Mansour Ebrahimzadeh. He was given #2 and made his debut in a 1–0 loss against Zob Ahan in the 2013–14 Iran Pro League final fixture.

Saba
He joined Saba Qom in summer 2014. He signed a three-year contract and was given the number 40.

Club career statistics

International career

U17
He is part of Iran U-17 from 2009 until 2011.

U20
He is part of Iran U-20 during 2011 & 2012.

U23
He invited to Iran U-23 training camp by Nelo Vingada.

References

External links
Mohammadreza Ghodratipour at PersianLeague.com
Mohammadreza Ghodratipour at IranLeague.ir
Mohammadreza Ghodratipour at Tehran Football Department

1994 births
Living people
Iranian footballers
Rah Ahan players
Saba players
Iran under-20 international footballers
Sportspeople from Isfahan
Association football goalkeepers